Graham Samuel Ackerman (born July 14, 1983) is an American gymnast. In April 2005 he won the national championship in the floor exercise event at the 2005 NCAA Men's Gymnastics championship at the United States Military Academy at West Point, New York, making him a three-time national champ. In 2004 he won the national titles in two events—floor and vault. Ackerman is openly gay.

Career
During his early career, Ackerman had many large accomplishments. In 1995 he was the Washington state men's gymnastics champion. In 1997 and 1998 he competed in junior nationals. In 1999 Graham was once again Washington state men's gymnastics champion as well as the regional all around champion. 2001 was a big year for Ackerman. He competed in United States nationals where he placed 1st in the floor and vault exercises and 9th all around. He was also the regional all around champion as well the junior national floor and vault champion. During summer of 2003, Ackerman competed at the USA championships in Milwaukee, Wisconsin where he won the silver medal on vault. In August 2003, Ackerman was chosen to represent the United States at the World Championships in Taegu, Korea.

Ackerman began attending University of California-Berkeley in 2002. His freshman season began with a slow start due to an ankle injury. However, he recovered with time to earn All-American honors in p-bar with a score of 8.575 which earned him 6th place at NCAAs. In his second-ever intercollegiate meet, a Stanford Invite, Ackerman earned a score of 9.775 of the floor which was a team season-high. Later on this season, Ackerman competed strong at Gold's Challenge in Santa Barbara. Here he scored a career high 8.700 on the pommel horse and a solid 8.750 on the horizontal bar. He also earned Academic All-American honors.

In 2008, Ackerman earned a Master's degree from the London School of Economics.

References

1983 births
Living people
American male artistic gymnasts
California Golden Bears men's gymnasts
Gay sportsmen
LGBT gymnasts
LGBT people from Washington (state)
American LGBT sportspeople
Sportspeople from Seattle
20th-century American people
21st-century American people